The 2017–18 Taça de Portugal (also known as Taça de Portugal Placard for sponsorship reasons) was the 78th season of the Taça de Portugal, the premier knockout competition in Portuguese football.

The competition was contested by 153 clubs, including teams from the top-three tiers of the Portuguese football league system and representatives of the fourth-tier District leagues and cups. It began with the first-round matches in September 2017 and was concluded in May 2018 with the final at the Estádio Nacional.

Desportivo das Aves defeated Sporting CP 2–1 and won their first Taça de Portugal, succeeding Benfica as trophy holders, but did not qualify for  the 2018–19 UEFA Europa League group stage since they failed to obtain a license for European competitions.

Format

Schedule 
All draws are held at the FPF headquarters at Cidade do Futebol, in Oeiras. Match kick-off times are in WET (UTC±0) from the fourth round to the semi-finals, and in WEST (UTC+1) during the rest of the competition.

First round 
A total of 120 teams from the Campeonato de Portugal (CP) and the District Football Associations (D) entered the first round. The draw took place on Wednesday, 9 August 2017, at 15:00 WEST. Teams were divided into eight series of 14 or 16 teams according to geographic criteria. Matches were played on 3 and 4 September 2017.
 

Fixtures

Series A

|}

Series B

|}

Series C

|}

Series D

|}

Series E

|}

Series F

|}

Series G

|}

Series H

|}

Second round 

Repechage
The following 17 first-round losing teams were selected to compete in the second round:

 Alcains (D)
 Bragança (CP)
 Canaviais (D)
 Coruchense (CP)
 Crato (D)
 Lamego (D)
 Leiria Marrazes (D)
 Lourinhanense (D)
 Mirandela (CP)
 Mondinense (CP)
 Oriental (CP)
 Pinhalnovense (CP)
 Sertanense (CP)
 Sourense (CP)
 Vasco Gama (CP)
 Vila Real (D)
 Vilafranquense (CP)

Fixtures

Third round 
A total of 64 teams participated in the third round, which included the 46 winners of the previous round and the 18 teams competing in the 2017–18 Primeira Liga (I). The draw took place on Thursday, 28 September 2017, at 15:00 WEST,  and matches were played between 12 and 15 October 2017. 

Fixtures

Fourth round 
A total of 32 teams participated in the fourth round, all of which advanced from the previous round. The draw took place on Thursday, 19 October 2017, at 12:30 WEST, and unlike previous rounds, was free of restrictions. Matches were played between 16 and 19 November 2017.

Fixtures

Fifth round 
A total of 16 teams participated in the fifth round, all of which advanced from the previous round. The draw took place on Wednesday, 22 November 2017, at 12:30 WET, and matches were played between 6 and 30 December 2017.

Fixtures

Quarter-finals
Eight teams participated in the quarter-finals, all having advanced from the previous round. The draw took place on Monday, 18 December 2017, at 12:00 WET, and matches were played on 10 and 11 January 2018.

Fixtures

Semi-finals
The semi-final pairings were determined after the draw for the quarter-finals on Monday, 18 December 2017, at 12:00 WET. This round will be contested over two legs in a home-and-away system, with the first leg played on 7 and 28 February and the second leg played on 18 April 2018.

Fixtures

Desportivo das Aves won 3–1 on aggregate.

1–1 on aggregate. Sporting CP won 5–4 on penalties.

Final

Bracket

Notes

References

External links
Official webpage 

Taça de Portugal seasons
Portugal
Cup